Spirit is the debut studio album by American rock band Spirit, released on January 22, 1968 by Ode Records. The album was commercially successful, spending more than six months on the Billboard album charts, peaking at #31. It was voted number 658 in Colin Larkin's All Time Top 1000 Albums 3rd Edition (2000).

Similarity to "Stairway to Heaven" 
The guitar part of "Taurus" is said to have influenced Led Zeppelin's Jimmy Page in writing "Stairway to Heaven". Led Zeppelin opened for Spirit on an American tour in 1968, and also borrowed from "Fresh Garbage" in live performances of the song 'As Long as I Have You'.

Release history

In 1973, Epic released a two-disc LP repackage of Spirit and Clear simply entitled Spirit.

The album was first issued on compact disc in 1996 by Sony. The original 1968 stereo mixes were not available for this release, so the album was remixed in stereo from the original multitrack tapes. This edition also includes four previously unreleased bonus tracks.

In 2017, Audio Fidelity reissued the album as a numbered limited edition hybrid SACD. This edition was remastered from the original 1968 stereo master tapes, which had not been commercially available since the LP release was discontinued in the 1970s. The 2017 edition also includes bonus tracks in the same mixes as those on the 1996 reissue.

Track listing

Personnel

Spirit 
 Jay Ferguson – lead vocals, percussion
 Randy California – guitars, backing vocals, bass
 John Locke – keyboards
 Mark Andes – bass, backing vocals
 Ed Cassidy – drums, percussion

Production 
 Lou Adler – producer
 Marty Paich – string & horn arrangements
 Eirik Wangberg, Armin Steiner & Mike Leitz – engineers
 Corporate Head – album design
 Tom Wilkes – art direction
 Guy Webster – cover photo
 Jay Thompson – back cover photo
 Terry Clements, Marshall Blonstein, Doug Wallack – assistance
 Vic Anesini – mastering, mixing
 Nicholas Bennett – packaging manager
 Adam Block – project director, project coordinator
 Bob Irwin – producer, compilation producer
 Jeff Smith – package design
 Jay Thompson – photography, insert photography
 Douglas Wallack – road manager

Charts

See also
Stairway to Heaven lawsuit

References 

1968 debut albums
Albums arranged by Marty Paich
Albums produced by Lou Adler
Epic Records albums
Legacy Recordings albums
Spirit (band) albums